Jahon Qurbonov (Russian: Dzhakhon Kurbanov; born 12 February 1986, in Leninabad, now Khujand) is an amateur boxer from Tajikistan, who competed in the 2006 Asian Games in the Light Heavyweight (-81 kg) division. There he beat Mehdi Ghorbani in the semifinals and won the gold medal in a decisive final bout against Korea's Hak Sung Song 30-15.

At the 2007 World Championships he beat Luis Gonzalez but was DQd against Yerkebulan Shynaliyev.

At the 2008 Summer Olympics in Beijing, Qurbanov beat Abbos Atoev of Uzbekistan and then Croatia's Marijo Šivolija before being eliminated by Shynaliyev, again via DQ for biting.

He qualified for the 2012 Olympics in London, where he was knocked out by Yahia El-Mekachari in the first round.

References

External links

 
 

1986 births
Living people
People from Khujand
Tajikistani male boxers
Olympic boxers of Tajikistan
Boxers at the 2008 Summer Olympics
Boxers at the 2012 Summer Olympics
Asian Games medalists in boxing
Boxers at the 2006 Asian Games
Boxers at the 2010 Asian Games
Boxers at the 2014 Asian Games
Asian Games gold medalists for Tajikistan
Asian Games bronze medalists for Tajikistan
Medalists at the 2006 Asian Games
Medalists at the 2010 Asian Games
Light-heavyweight boxers